The 1960 Iowa State Cyclones football team represented Iowa State University in the Big Eight Conference during the 1960 NCAA University Division football season. In their third year under head coach Clay Stapleton, the Cyclones compiled a 7–3 record (4–3 against conference opponents), finished in fourth place in the conference, and outscored their opponents by a combined total of 185 to 136. They played their home games at Clyde Williams Field in Ames, Iowa.

The regular starting lineup on offense consisted of left ended Larry Montre, left tackle Ron Walter, left guard Dick Scensiak, center Arden Esslinger, right guard Dan Celoni, right tackle Larry Van Der Heyden, right end Don Webb, quarterback Cliff Rick, left halfback Dave Hoppmann, right halfback J.W. Burden, and fullback Tom Watkins. Gary Ellis was the punter, and Cliff Rick was the placekicker. Arden Esslinger was the team captain.

The team's statistical leaders included Dave Hoppmann with 844 rushing yards and 214 passing yards, Don Webb with 203 receiving yards, and Tom Watkins with 60 points scored (10 touchdowns) each. Tom Watkins was selected as a first-team all-conference player.

Schedule

References

Iowa State
Iowa State Cyclones football seasons
Iowa State Cyclones football